In Anglican church music, a service is a musical setting of certain parts of the liturgy, generally for choir with or without organ accompaniment.

Liturgical services

Morning Prayer
Venite (Psalm 95 — rarely set after the Restoration)
Te Deum or Benedicite
Benedictus (Luke I, 68) or Jubilate (Psalm 100)

Evening Prayer
Magnificat or (rarely) Cantate Domino (Psalm 98)
Nunc dimittis or (rarely) Deus misereatur (Psalm 67)

Holy Communion
Responses to the Commandments
Nicene Creed
Sanctus
Agnus Dei
Kyrie Eleison
Gloria in Excelsis

This follows the Book of Common Prayer. Modern Anglican liturgy has largely reverted to the order of the Roman Catholic Mass. Unlike masses written in the Catholic tradition, however, masses by Anglican composers may choose to omit the Credo, which, in Anglican churches, is often recited rather than sung. Also, rather than setting the traditional Latin and Greek liturgy, several Anglican-composed masses use an English translation, such as that contained within the 1662 Book of Common Prayer.

Full service and other services
A "Full Service" includes all three of these groups. But with the demise of daily "Matins" (choral morning prayer) from the Anglican liturgy and the reduction of the choral element in communion services composers are now more likely only to set the evening service.

The "Burial Service" (see Requiem) is sometimes set separately.

History
In the Tudor and early Stuart periods, services were described as "Short", "Great" or "Verse" services:
 Verse services incorporated sections for solo voices.
 Short services were simple settings for four-part choir which could be sung a cappella.
 Great Services (of which the most famous is the Great Service by William Byrd) were long and elaborate and presumably kept for special occasions.

Following the Restoration this classification gradually broke down and services became known by the key in which they were written; hence the common shorthand terminology "Purcell in G minor" or "Stanford in B flat".

From the twentieth century, compositions are often named after the college chapel or cathedral for which they were written: examples are the Collegium Magdalenae Oxoniense of Kenneth Leighton for Magdalen College, Oxford and the Gloucester Service of Herbert Howells for Gloucester Cathedral.

External links
Church music UK

Church of England
Christian liturgical music